Vilnius Biofuel Power Plant is a waste-to-energy plant in Vilnius, Lithuania. The plant produces 40% of all annual heating requirements for the city of Vilnius.

It was built next to decommissioned Vilnius Combined Heat and Power Plant and utilises some of the infrastructure.

References

External links 
 Official website

Energy infrastructure completed in 2021
2021 establishments in Lithuania
Cogeneration power stations in Lithuania
Power stations in Vilnius
Biofuel power stations in Lithuania
Waste power stations in Lithuania